Death into Life is a 1946 novel by British writer Olaf Stapledon. Not strictly science fiction (the genre into which Stapledon's works are usually classified), the novel is described as "an imaginative treatment of the problem of survival after death". It deals primarily with the soul of a rear gunner who is killed in World War II, and who finds himself surviving his apparent death - first as part of a spirit bomber-crew, then as part of the spirits who were killed in the battle, and so on until finally his soul becomes part of a 'cosmical spirit'.

The book was the second to last work of Stapledon's fiction to be published during the author's lifetime.

1946 British novels
1946 speculative fiction novels
British philosophical novels
Novels set during World War II
Novels by Olaf Stapledon
Methuen Publishing books